Adjala–Tosorontio is a township in south-central Ontario, Canada, in the County of Simcoe.

A predominantly rural area, Adjala–Tosorontio contains numerous small villages and hamlets. Many communities were started in Adjala by Irish Catholics who named their hamlets after their home towns in Ireland, or after prominent pioneer families who first settled the area. The municipality has increasingly become home to residents who commute to the Greater Toronto Area.

Geographically the area is rolling countryside below the Niagara Escarpment to the west, with the Nottawasaga River cutting through it.

"" is a Huron word meaning "Beautiful Mountain", and Adjala was the name of the wife of Chief Tecumseh, for whom the neighbouring township (now called New Tecumseth) was named.

History
Adjala–Tosorontio Township was created in 1993 when the County of Simcoe Act merged the townships of Adjala and Tosorontio.  The amalgamation took effect on January 1, 1994.

Communities
The township comprises the communities of Achill, Airlie, Athlone, Ballycroy, Cedarville, Colgan, Connor, Everett, Glencairn, Hockley, Keenansville, Lisle, Loretto, Rosemont, Sheldon, Tioga and Tuam.

Loretto
Loretto is one of the oldest communities in Adjala–Tosorontio. It has one of the oldest and most famous taverns in Simcoe County, the Loretto Inn.  Highway 50 runs through the town.

Loretto was named after Loreto, Marche in Italy.

Demographics

See also
 List of municipalities in Ontario
List of townships in Ontario
Earl Rowe Provincial Park

References

External links 

Lower-tier municipalities in Ontario
Municipalities in Simcoe County
Township municipalities in Ontario